Oxygen regulation can refer to:
 The physiological regulation of oxygen in plants and animals. See Control of respiration.
 The dangerous sexual practice of erotic asphyxiation